A constitutional referendum was held in the People's Republic of the Congo on 8 July 1979. The new constitution was approved by 96.93% of voters, with a 90.3% turnout.

Results

References

1979 referendums
1979
1979 in the Republic of the Congo
Constitutional referendums in the Republic of the Congo